Pierre Victor Théophile Bertin (24 October 1891 – 13 May 1984) was a French stage and film actor. In 1948, he starred in the film The Lame Devil under Sacha Guitry.

He was the librettist of the opéra-comique La Gageure imprévue after Sedaine with music by Henri Sauguet, first performed at the Paris, Opéra-Comique in 1944, and for the radio opera Les Deux Rendez-vous (after Nerval) by Claude Arrieu first broadcast in 1951.

Pierre Bertin was born in Lille and died in Paris.

Selected filmography 

 L'instinct (1916)
 Le secret de la comtesse (1917)
 Love Songs (1930) - Claude Merlerault
 Montmartre (1931) - Frédéric Charençon
 Je serai seule après minuit (1931) - Michel
 The Champion Cook (1932) - Oscar Ormont
 The Chocolate Girl (1932) - Paul Normand
 L'affaire de la rue Mouffetard (1932) - L'avocat
 Le roi bis (1932) - Leducq
 Professeur Cupidon (1933) - Suchet - un professeur timide
 Une nuit de folies (1934) - Anatole
 Coralie et Cie (1934)
 Let's Make a Dream (1936) - Un invité (prologue)
 La main passe (1936)
 Girls in Distress (1939) - Legris, le secrétaire de Me Presle
 Péchés de jeunesse (1941) - Gaston Noblet
 Mademoiselle Béatrice (1943) - Archange
 Shop Girls of Paris (1943) - Gaujon
 Le Corbeau (1943) - Le sous-préfet
 L'insaisissable Frédéric (1946) - Granier
 Cyrano de Bergerac (1946) - Le comte de Guiche
 The Queen's Necklace (1946) - L'abbé Loth
 Pas un mot à la reine mère (1946) - Le duc de Palestrinat
 The Beautiful Trip (1947) - Le passager au monocle
 Le château de la dernière chance (1947) - Le professeur Patureau-Duparc
 The Lame Devil (1948) - Le baron de Nesselrode
 Wicked City (1949) - Le monsieur sérieux
 Orpheus (1950) - Le commissaire
 Cartouche, King of Paris (1950) - Monsieur de Boisgreux
 Véronique (1950) - Croquenard
 Tire au flanc (1950) - Le colonel
 My Friend Oscar (1951) - UNESCO Director-General
 Dr. Knock (1951) - L'instituteur Bernard
 My Seal and Them (1951) - Monsieur de Saint-Brive
 Monsieur Fabre (1951) - L'empereur Napoléon III
 Il padrone sono me (1955) - Il professore
 On ne badine pas avec l'amour (1955) - Le baron
 Elena and Her Men (1956) - Martin-Michaud
 Babette Goes to War (1959) - Le Duc de Crécy
 La marraine de Charley (1959) - M. de Saint-Sevran
 Les Bonnes Femmes (1960) - Monsieur Belin
 Dialogue with the Carmelites (1960) - Le marquis de la Force
 Les Tontons flingueurs (1963) - Adolphe Amédée Delafoy
 Comment épouser un premier ministre (1964) - Le présentateur de la soirée de gala
 Pas de caviar pour tante Olga (1965) - M. Dumont-Freville
 Les Bons Vivants (1965) - Le président du tribunal (segment "Procès, Le")
 Nights of Farewell (1965) - Petipa's Father
 La Grande Vadrouille (1966) - Le grand-père de Juliette - propriétaire du guignol
 The Stranger (1967) - Judge
 La Vie parisienne (as the Baron de Gondremarck, 1967), directed by Yves-André Hubert (television version of 1958 stage production by Jean-Louis Barrault).
 A Time for Loving (1972) - Invité de mme. olga
 Repeated Absences (1972) - Georges, le vieil homosexuel
 L'oiseau rare (1973) - Jérôme Dieudonné, le poète
 Calmos (1976) - Le chanoine
 Le beaujolais nouveau est arrivé (1978) - Le vieux Casseur

References

External links

'Pierre Bertin (Baron de Gondremarck) and Denise Benoît (Métella) in La Vie parisienne in 1960 (INA: Institut national de l'audiovisuel) accessed 24 November 2019.

1891 births
1984 deaths
French male film actors
French male silent film actors
Mass media people from Lille
20th-century French male actors
Sociétaires of the Comédie-Française